Godkin is a surname. Notable people with the surname include:

Edwin Lawrence Godkin (1831–1902), Irish-born American journalist and newspaper editor
George Godkin (1860–1919), jeweller, watchmaker and political figure in Prince Edward Island, Canada
James Godkin (1806–1879), Irish author and journalist who was influential on ecclesiastical and land questions
John Godkin Giles (1834–1903), Ontario medical doctor and political figure

See also
Godkin Lectures, annual lecture hosted by Harvard University's John F. Kennedy School of Government
Godaikin
Godki
Goodkind (disambiguation)